The fourth season of Degrassi: The Next Generation commenced airing in Canada on 7 September 2004, concluded on 14 February 2005 and contains twenty-two episodes. Degrassi: The Next Generation is a Canadian serial teen drama television series. This season depicts the lives of a group of high school sophomores and juniors as they deal with some of the challenges and issues teenagers face such as bullying, dysfunctional families, school shootings, mental disorders, STDs, disabilities, gambling, homosexuality, and inappropriate student-teacher relationships.

Every episode is titled after a song from the 1980s, except for the two-part season finale "Goin' Down the Road", which took its name from the 1970 Canadian film Goin' Down the Road. Filming took place between April and October 2004.

The first six episodes of season four aired Tuesdays at 8:00 p.m. and 8:30 p.m. on CTV, a Canadian terrestrial television network, before settling into its regular 8:30 p.m. timeslot. When the season returned to the schedules in January 2005 following a break over the Christmas period, it aired on Mondays at 8:30 p.m. In the United States, it was broadcast on the Noggin cable channel during its programming block for teenagers, The N. The season was released on DVD as a four disc boxed set on 28 November 2006 by Alliance Atlantis Home Entertainment in Canada, and by FUNimation Entertainment in the US on 24 October 2006. The last three episodes were also sold in the US, packaged together in two different releases; one version was dubbed "unrated, uncensored and uncut" and featured an audio commentary and other bonus material, the other version was dubbed "rated", and did not feature the audio commentary. The season is available on iTunes. This was the first season to release a soundtrack, Songs from Degrassi: The Next Generation was available as a digital download on 1 November 2005.

Season four was one of Degrassi: The Next Generation's most successful seasons for viewing figures. Two episodes were watched by nearly a million Canadian viewers and helped the season garner an average audience of 600,000, making it the most-viewed domestic drama in Canada. In the US, one episode from the season was watched by over half-a-million viewers, the highest audience figure The N had ever had. Only three awards were won for the season, from a total of nine nominations.

Season four is considered to be the darkest and most controversial season of the show, due to multiple storylines that dealt with harsh and dark issues, especially the two-part episode "Time Stands Still", which involves a school shooting. This garnered the show more international attention than originally.

Cast
This is the only season of the series to not add any new characters to the main cast (recurring previously or not).

Main cast
 Jake Epstein as Craig Manning (21 episodes)
 Cassie Steele as Manuela "Manny" Santos (18 episodes)
 Miriam McDonald as Emma Nelson (17 episodes)
 Adamo Ruggiero as Marco Del Rossi (17 episodes)
 Drake as Jimmy Brooks (16 episodes)
 Shane Kippel as Gavin "Spinner" Mason (16 episodes)
 Lauren Collins as Paige Michalchuk (16 episodes)
 Stefan Brogren as Archie "Snake" Simpson (16 episodes)
 Stacey Farber as Ellie Nash (13 episodes)
 Andrea Lewis as Hazel Aden (13 episodes)
 Ryan Cooley as James Tiberius "J.T." Yorke (13 episodes)
 Melissa McIntyre as Ashley Kerwin (12 episodes)
 Sarah Barrable-Tishauer as Liberty Van Zandt (12 episodes)
 Jake Goldsbie as Toby Isaacs (10 episodes)
 Stacie Mistysyn as Caitlin Ryan (9 episodes)
 Daniel Clark as Sean Cameron (9 episodes)
 Dan Woods as Mr. Raditch (9 episodes)
 Amanda Stepto as Christine "Spike" Nelson (8 episodes)
 Pat Mastroianni as Joey Jeremiah (8 episodes)

Recurring cast
 Deanna Casaluce as Alex Nuñez (16 episodes)
 Mike Lobel as Jay Hogart (14 episodes)
 Melissa DiMarco as Daphne Hatzilakos (9 episodes)
 Dalmar Abuzeid as Danny Van Zandt (9 episodes)
 John Bregar as Dylan Michalchuk (8 episodes)
 Shenae Grimes as Darcy Edwards (6 episodes)
 Linlyn Lue as Ms. Laura Kwan (6 episodes)
 Alexa Steele as Angela Jeremiah (6 episodes)
 Michael Kinney as Coach Darryl Armstrong (5 episodes)
 Ephraim Ellis as Rick Murray (5 episodes)
 Christopher Jacot as Matt Oleander  (5 episodes)
 Bailey Corneal as Amy (4 episodes)
 Jonathan Keltz as Nate (4 episodes)
 Skye Regan as Student (4 episodes)
 Jennifer Podemski as Ms. Chantel Sauvé  (3 episodes)
 Daniel Morrison as Chris Sharpe (3 episodes)
 Cintija Ašperger as Mrs. Murray (3 episodes)
 Andrew Gillies as Robert Kerwin (3 episodes)
 David Orth as Christopher (3 episodes)
 Marjorie Chan as Meeri (3 episodes)
 Maria Ricossa as Kate Kerwin (3 episodes)
 Jason Deline as Camera Man (3 episodes)
 Kevin Smith as himself/Silent Bob  (3 episodes)
 Jason Mewes as himself/Jay (2 episodes)

Guest stars
 Susan Cuthbert as Mrs. Michalchuk (2 episodes)
 Shawn Roberts as Dean (2 episodes)
 Kirsten Kieferle as Mrs. Nash (2 episodes)
 Elisa Moolecherry as Sydney (2 episodes)
 Inga Cadranel as Rachel Rhodes (2 episodes)
 Lisa Ciara as Heather Sinclair (2 episodes)
 Leah Cudmore as Sally (2 episodes)
 Philip Nozuka as Chester Hosoda (2 episodes)
 Tom Melissis as Mr. Dom Perino (2 episodes)
 Conrad Coates as Mr. Jemaine Brooks (2 episodes)
 Jajube Mandiela as Chantay Black (2 episodes)
 Jennifer Schwalbach as Blonde Camera Assistant (2 episodes)
 Rosemary Dunsmore as Judge (1 episode)
 Alison Sealy-Smith as Dean's Lawyer (1 episode)
 Daryn Jones as Music Store Employee (1 episode)
 James Gilpin as Crown Attorney (1 episode)
 Ken Pak as Summons Officer (1 episode)
 Stephen Amell as Doorman (1 episode)
 Alan Blenkinsopp as Police Officer (1 episode)
 Samantha Gutstadt as Customer (1 episode)
 Drew Nelson as Fraternity Pledge (1 episode)
 Tony Sciara as Mr. Del Rossi (1 episode)
 Brona Brown as Mrs. Louisa Del Rossi (1 episode)
 Livingstone Beaumont as The Dot GRILL Manager (1 episode)
 Valerie Boyle as Helen (1 episode)
 Joseph Motiki as Guest Host (1 episode)
 Michael Vella as Smart Student (1 episode)
 Dino Bellisario as Policeman (1 episode)
 Gerry Mendicino as Detective (1 episode)
 Jayne Eastwood as Mrs. Cameron (1 episode)
 Shawn Lawrence as Mr. Cameron (1 episode)
 Brandon Lee Carrera as Tyler Bishop (1 episode)
 Jung-Yul Kim as Bouncer (1 episode)
 Lara Kelly as Charlie (1 episode)
 Elvira Kurt as Wedder (1 episode)
 Terrence Bryant as Dr. Jim (1 episode)
 Lisa Karpov as Pretty Girl (1 episode)
 James Taylor as Nigel (1 episode)
 Marc Borins as Guy (1 episode)
 Heather Cherron as Receptionist (1 episode)
 Bradley Karel as Kid Elrick (1 episode)
 Amanda Lee as Nurse Paula (1 episode)
 Lucas Penar as Scary Looking Dude (1 episode)
 Pragna Desai as Health Nurse (1 episode)
 Roy Lewis as Mr. Harold Van Zandt (1 episode)
 Ingrid Veninger as New Manager of The Dot GRILL (1 episode)
 Adam Bloch as Ben (1 episode)
 Tyler Gallagher as James (1 episode)
 Ted Ludzik as Mr. Martin (1 episode)
 Loretta Clow as Matt's Professor (1 episode)
 George Nozuka as Chad Hosoda (1 episode)
 Justin Nozuka as Chuck Hosoda (1 episode)
 Alexandra Castillo as Nurse Davis (1 episode)
 Justin Atkinson as Eric (1 episode)
 Eve Crawford as Mary (1 episode)
 Matt Murray as Mike (1 episode)
 Adam Reid as Dave (1 episode)
 Kathy Bocek as Paige Double (1 episode)
 Billy Khouri as Tomas (1 episode)
 Alanis Morissette as herself  (1 episode)
 Morgan Kelly as Skinny (1 episode)
 Darren McGuire as Ninja #1 (1 episode)
 Chris McGuire as Ninja #2 (1 episode)

Crew
The season was produced by Epitome Pictures in association CTV. Funding was provided by The Canadian Film or Video Production Tax Credit and the Ontario Film and Television Tax Credit, the Canadian Television Fund and BCE-CTV Benefits, The Shaw Television Broadcast Fund, the Independent Production Fund, Mountain Cable Program, and RBC Royal Bank.

The season's executive producers are Epitome Pictures' president Stephen Stohn, and CEO Linda Schuyler, the co-creator of the Degrassi franchise. Aaron Martin was promoted from executive story editor during the third season to executive producer. Degrassi: The Next Generation co-creator Yan Moore served as the creative consultant and David Lowe was the line producer. Sean Reycraft and Shelley Scarrow served as co-executive story editors. Brendon Yorke was the story editor, and Miklos Perlus the junior story editor. The editor was Stephen Withrow, Stephen Stanley was the production designer, and the cinematographer was Gavin Smith.

The writers for the season are Sean Carley, Richard Clark, R. Scott Cooper, James Hurst, Aaron Martin, Miklos Perlus, Sean Reycraft, Shelley Scarrow, Brandon Yorke. Kevin Smith was allowed to rewrite his dialogue for the episodes which he appeared in. Graeme Campbell, Philip Earnshaw, Eleanore Lindo, Ron Murphy, Sudz Sutherland, and Stefan Scaini directed the episodes.

Reception
An episode featuring a storyline about a school shooting garnered the series an all-time high audience of 930,000 Canadian viewers. A second episode with a storyline about oral sex also earned just under 1,000,000 viewers. Overall, the season averaged an audience of 600,000 and was the top domestic drama for Canadian teenagers aged 12 to 17, and adults in three age brackets; ages 18 to 34, ages 18 to 49, and ages 25 to 54. In the US, the season received an 80% larger audience compared to season three, and one episode received 540,000 viewers and drew a Nielsen rating of 2.7 for teenagers and 4.7 for female teenagers, meaning that on average 2.7% of the nation's teenagers, and 4.7% of the nation's female teenagers were tuned in at any given moment.

The season was well received amongst critics, especially in regards to the episodes with Kevin Smith and the storylines on oral sex and the school shooting. The Palm Beach Post said the series "is told from a teenager's point of view since the writers have no interest in appealing to a broad-based demographic like the writers on, say, Fox's The O.C. ... it connects with teens on their level", though it was still "surprised Jay used the graphic oral sex term you'd hear in just about every high school hallway in America", that word being "blow-job". The Boston Herald said "it is important for teens to learn about sexually transmitted diseases and the cost of unprotected sex ... and should help parents begin conversations with their own children". PopMatters's Jodie Janella Horn described Degrassi: The Next Generation as "the most unnervingly accurate series ever of the high school genre". Another comparison was made between Degrassi: The Next Generation and The O.C., saying "The O.C. will never remind me of anything in my life", while the events in the two-part episode "Voices Carry" with "hotel room trashing, projectile launching, fist fighting at weddings bi-polar loon Craig [and girlfriend Ashley], was like an actual scene from my actual teenage life and just like me, Ashley thinks they're going to pull through it together". AfterElton.com, a website that focuses on the portrayal of gay and bisexual men in the media praised the series for "not only focusing on gay teens, but it showcases gay sex, and relationships. By not stereotyping [the gay characters] they are helping thousands of confused and shameful teenagers feel accepted, in Canada and America alike." Ben Neihart called Degrassi: The Next Generation "tha Best Teen TV N da WRLD!" (the best teen TV in the world) in a six-page article in The New York Times. Commenting that "the explosive-issue-per-capita ratio is seriously out of whack", he admitted that "the teen-diary attention to microissues (zits, periods, parents' night) gives the episodes a peculiar authenticity no matter how outrageous their story lines".

Two episodes were nominated for "Best Youth Script" at the Canadian Screenwriting Awards, which are administered by the Writers Guild of Canada. Shelley Scarrow's "Secrets Part One" lost out to "Mercy Street", written by James Hurst and Miklos Perlus. At the Directors Guild of Canada Awards, Stefan Sciani won the award for "Outstanding Achievement in a Television Series - Family" for the episode "Time Stands Still Part Two", and Stephen Stanley was nominated for the "Outstanding Achievement in Production Design - Television Series" category for the episode "Goin' Down the Road". The series won its first Teen Choice Award in the US for "Choice Summer Series" At the Young Artist Awards, Degrassi: The Next Generation failed to win any of the awards its actors were nominated for. Adamo Ruggiero was nominated in the "Best Performance in a TV Comedy Series Leading Young Actor" category, Aubrey Graham was nominated in the "Best Performance in a TV Comedy Series Supporting Young Actor" category, and Alex Steele was nominated in the "Best Performance in a TV Comedy Series Recurring Young Actress" category. The entire cast was nominated in the "Outstanding Young Performers in a TV Series" category".

Episodes
The season premiere was an hour-long television special. CTV broadcast episodes two and three, four and five, and twenty and twenty-one on the same nights, though not as hour-long specials. In the United States, Noggin's The N block aired the season in two separate waves: the first wave began on October 1, 2004 and ran until March 11, 2005. The second wave, advertised as the "Summer '05" season, was screened between July 1, 2005 and August 26, 2005. The season premiere, and episodes 13-14, aired as hour-long specials.

DVD releases
The DVD release of season four was released by Alliance Atlantis Home Entertainment in Canada on 28 November 2006, and by FUNimation Entertainment in the US on 24 October 2006 after it had completed broadcast on television. It was released in Australia by Shock Records on 13 April 2011. As well as every episode from the season, the DVD release features bonus material including deleted scenes, bloopers and behind-the-scenes featurettes.

The final three episodes of the season were also released separately from the complete season release on 8 November 2005. They were packaged together in two different versions; one was dubbed "unrated, uncensored and uncut" and featured an audio commentary and other bonus material, the other was dubbed "rated", and did not feature the audio commentary.

References

Notes

External links
Season 4 episode synopses at CTV Television Network
 List of Degrassi: The Next Generation episodes at IMDB.

Degrassi: The Next Generation seasons
Bipolar disorder in fiction
2004 Canadian television seasons
2005 Canadian television seasons